It was a Dacian fortified town.

References

Dacian fortresses in Brașov County
Historic monuments in Brașov County